Cedar Grove is a historic farm property at 1083 Blanes Mill Road in rural southern Halifax County, Virginia, north of Alton.  The farm's main house is a two-story frame structure, estimated to have been built about 1775 but also altered several times in the 19th century.  Its interior has a combination of Federal and Greek Revival features, and the domestic outbuildings of the property include an office with Greek and Gothic Revival features, and a small family cemetery.  The house is believed to be one of the oldest surviving buildings in the county.

The property was listed on the National Register of Historic Places in 2017.

See also
National Register of Historic Places listings in Halifax County, Virginia

References

Houses on the National Register of Historic Places in Virginia
Greek Revival architecture in Virginia
Houses completed in 1775
Houses in Halifax County, Virginia
National Register of Historic Places in Halifax County, Virginia
Historic districts in Virginia